Klamath may refer to:

Ethnic groups
Klamath people, a Native American people of California and Oregon
Klamath Tribes, a federally recognized group of tribes in Oregon
Klamath language, spoken by the Klamath people

Places in the United States
False Klamath, California, a coastal area along U.S. Route 101
Fort Klamath, a former military outpost in Oregon
Fort Klamath, Oregon, a present-day unincorporated community near the former fort
Klamath, California, a census-designated place
Klamath, California, former name of Johnsons, California
Klamath Basin, the region in Oregon and California drained by the Klamath River
Klamath County, California
Klamath County, Oregon
Klamath Mountains, in California and Oregon
Klamath National Forest
Klamath River, in Oregon and California

Science and technology
Klamath (microprocessor), a variant of the Pentium II microprocessor
Klamath, a steamship ferry launched of the Richmond–San Rafael Ferry Company
 Klamath (steamboat), a steamboat that operated on Lower Klamath Lake in the early 20th century
 , a U.S. Navy steamer

Other uses
Klamath Hardwoods, now Columbia Forest Products, an American hardwood manufacturer
 Klamath (album), a 2009 album by American musician Mark Eitzel

See also
Klamath 5, or "555", a common prefix for fictitious telephone numbers
Klamath coneflower, a species of genus Rudbeckia
Klamath fawn lily, a species of genus Erythronium
Klamath Lake sculpin, a fish species of genus Cottus
Klamath trillium, or Pseudotrillium rivale, a flower species
Klamath weed, or St. John's wort, a flowering plant of family Hypericaceae

Language and nationality disambiguation pages